Sydenham House may refer to:

 Sydenham House, Devon, England
 Sydenham House, Essex County, New Jersey, United States
 Sydenham House, Somerset, England